Bachelor Girl is a 1988 Australian TV movie.

Plot
Dorothy Bloom is a 32-year-old single soap opera writer planning a long, quiet weekend in Melbourne. Her Aunt Esther wants her to meet a gynecologist but instead she runs into Karl Stanton, an old friend from uni days.

Cast
Lyn Pierse as Dot Bloom
Kym Gyngell as Karl Stanton
Jan Friedl as Helen Carter
Bruce Spence as Alistair Dredge Jr
Doug Tremlett as Charles
Ruth Yaffe as Aunt Esther
Jack Perry as Uncle Isaac
Monica Maugham as Sybil
Tim Robertson as Grant
Mark Minchinton as Gazza
Christine Mahoney as Jenny
Denis Moore as Bert

Production
It was financed with the assistance of Film Victoria and the Australian Film Commission.

Reception
The TV critic from The Age called the film "wonderfully whimsical. A sort of Aussie Heartburn, it combines liberal helpings of Jewish philosophy and humour, off-beat animation, accelerated footage and delicious satire."

References

External links
Bachelor Girl at IMDb
Bachelor Girl at TCMDB
Bachelor Girl at Screen Australia
Bachelor Girl at Oz Movies

Australian television films
1988 films
1980s English-language films
1980s Australian films